Life in Squares is a British television mini-series that was broadcast on BBC Two from 27 July to 10 August 2015. The title comes from Dorothy Parker's witticism that the Bloomsbury Group, whose lives it portrays, had "lived in squares, painted in circles and loved in triangles".

Plot
The three-part serial centres on the close and often fraught relationship between sisters, Vanessa Bell and Virginia Woolf, and Vanessa’s sexually complicated alliance with gay artist Duncan Grant as they, and their group of like-minded friends, navigate their way through love, sex and artistic life through the first half of the 20th century.

Production
The series was commissioned by Ben Stephenson and Lucy Richer, and produced by Ecosse Films in association with Tiger Aspect Productions. The executive producers are Lucy Bedford, Amanda Coe, Douglas Rae and Lucy Richer. Filming began in August 2014 in London and Charleston Farmhouse.

Cast
The main roles were played by:

Eve Best as Older Vanessa Bell
Ed Birch as Lytton Strachey
Lucy Boynton as Angelica Garnett 
Jack Davenport as David Garnett
Jerome Finch as Saxon Sydney-Turner
Phoebe Fox as Young Vanessa Bell
Andrew Havill as Older Clive Bell 
Guy Henry as Older Leonard Woolf
Sam Hoare as Young Clive Bell
Finn Jones as Julian Bell
Edmund Kingsley as John Maynard Keynes
Catherine McCormack as Virginia Woolf
Lydia Leonard as Young Virginia Woolf
James Northcote as Adrian Stephen 
James Norton as Young Duncan Grant
Rupert Penry-Jones as Older Duncan Grant
Al Weaver as Young Leonard Woolf

Critical reception
Writing in UK newspaper The Guardian, Lucy Mangan found that, "The drama took a certain effort of will to get into. You just have to accept that you are in a world where people convened salons, and probably did say things like 'Childe Harold is a load of posturing nonsense! It can’t hold a candle to Don Juan, even if the alexandrines are forced to breaking point!'" However, having made this effort Mangan, added: "[…] it’s very, very good. From Phoebe Fox and Lydia Leonard as the loving/warring sisters Vanessa, soon-to-be-Bell, and Virginia, slightly-later-to-be-Woolf, around whose increasingly strained relationship the story essentially revolves, to the doctor in a single scene realising his patient (the painter Duncan Grant) is 'an invert', the performances are uniformly wonderful (though Ed Birch as Lytton Strachey has so far the best part and the best time). And the script – once you take that linguistic leap of faith – is glorious. 'That’s what they do,' muses Virginia as she and Vanessa ponder the proclivities of the men in their house and lives. 'Exclude us. From clubs. Schools. Orifices.' Though on the last, Vanessa comes to disagree. She marries the uninverted Clive Bell and sends her sister a letter. 'Copulation a tremendous success!' Attagirl".

In The Independent, Ellen E Jones was less impressed, writing: "The romantic entanglements of this set are so complicated that there is an undeniable achievement in laying them out clearly, as writer Amanda Coe has done here. Alas, the work's the thing and while this opening episode contained all the gossip, it conveyed none of the depth of thought or artistic feeling that must ultimately justify our interest (if any) in these people". She concluded by citing both BBC Radio 4’s parody of the Bloomsbury Group, Gloomsbury, and the "excellent" BBC Four documentary How to Be Bohemian, as having "advanced an alternative view of the set as, essentially, self-indulgent ninnies, cosseted by their wealth. If you've had the pleasure of either programme it would have been especially difficult to take this new drama seriously".

Broadcast
Internationally, the series premiered in Australia on 27 October 2015 on BBC First.

References

External links
 
 

2015 British television series debuts
2015 British television series endings
2010s British drama television series
Television shows set in the United Kingdom
BBC television dramas
2010s British television miniseries
English-language television shows
2010s British LGBT-related drama television series
Bloomsbury Group in performing arts
Television shows set in Sussex